Roman Polanski is a Polish and French film director, producer, writer, and actor.

He has received five Academy Award nominations winning for Best Director for The Pianist (2002). He was previously nominated for Rosemary's Baby (1968), Chinatown (1974), and Tess (1979). He received two British Academy Film Awards for Best Direction for Chinatown and The Pianist. He also earned four Golden Globe Award nominations winning twice for Chinatown and Tess. He earned the Palme d'Or at the Cannes Film Festival for The Pianist.

Industry awards

Academy Awards

British Academy Film Awards

Golden Globe Awards

Festival awards

Cannes Film Festival

César Award

Berlin International Film Festival

New York Film Critics Circle

Venice Film Festival

Other awards

References

External links

website dedicated to Polanski's victims (7 November 2017)
Image of Roman Polanski leaving the courtroom in Santa Monica, California, 1977. Los Angeles Times Photographic Archive (Collection 1429). UCLA Library Special Collections, Charles E. Young Research Library, University of California, Los Angeles.

Lists of awards received by film director
Awards and nominations